Houp La! (or Houp-La!) is a 1928 British silent comedy film directed by Frank Miller and starring George Bellamy, Frank Stanmore and Peggy Carlisle. It was loosely based on the 1916 stage musical Houp La! by Hugh E. Wright and Fred Thompson. The film was made at Isleworth Studios in London.

Cast
 George Bellamy as Noah Swinley
 Frank Stanmore as Clown
 Peggy Carlisle as Spangles
 James Knight as Daniel
 Charles Garry as Proprietor

References

Bibliography
 Low, Rachel. The History of British Film: Volume IV, 1918–1929. Routledge, 1997.

External links

1928 films
British comedy films
British silent feature films
1928 comedy films
British films based on plays
Films shot at Isleworth Studios
British black-and-white films
1920s English-language films
1920s British films
Silent comedy films